Jimmy Connors was the defending champion.

Connors successfully defended his title, defeating Arthur Ashe, 6–3, 6–4, 6–1 in the final.

Seeds

  Jimmy Connors (champion)
  Guillermo Vilas (third round)
  John McEnroe (quarterfinals)
  Eddie Dibbs (third round)
  Vitas Gerulaitis (semifinals)
  Brian Gottfried (quarterfinals)
  Harold Solomon (quarterfinals)
  Corrado Barazzutti (second round)
  Roscoe Tanner (semifinals)
  Arthur Ashe (final)
  José Higueras (first round)
  Ilie Năstase (second round)
  Tim Gullikson (second round)
  Dick Stockton (first round)
  Wojtek Fibak (third round)
  John Alexander (first round)

Draw

Finals

Top half

Section 1

Section 2

Bottom half

Section 3

Section 4

References

 Main Draw

U.S. Pro Indoor
1979 Grand Prix (tennis)